Salikhovo (Sälix) is a rural locality (a selo) in Urman-Bishkadaksky Selsoviet, Ishimbaysky District, Bashkortostan, Russia. The population was 584 as of 2010. There are 14 streets.

Geography 
Salikhovo is located 17 km northeast of Ishimbay (the district's administrative centre) by road. Aptikovo is the nearest rural locality.

References 

Rural localities in Ishimbaysky District